LSD art is any art or visual displays inspired by psychedelic experiences and hallucinations known to follow the ingestion of LSD (lysergic acid diethylamide, also known colloquially as acid). Artists and scientists have been interested in the effect of LSD on drawing and painting since it first became available for legal use and general consumption.

LSD causes visual hallucinations, audiovisual synaesthesia, and experiences of de-realisation. When these effects are mixed with an artist, they often illustrate their hallucinations.

History 

LSD art dates back to the 1960s, where it became very common as well. The drug became so popular, that some countries started banning the substance in 1967. A French artist by the name of Henri Michaux, was considered “a pioneer in psychedelic art”. Michaux experimented with LSD while creating his now famous book, 'Miserable Miracle', which included both his writings and drawings. Many artists realised how LSD could also positively influence their artwork, which is why it was so popular throughout the 1960s.

Dr. Oscar Janiger was one of the pioneers in the field studying the relationship between LSD and creativity. What fascinated Janiger was that "paintings, under the influence of LSD, had some of the attributes of what looked like the work done by schizophrenics". Janiger maintained that trained artists could "maintain a certain balance, riding the edge" of the LSD induced psychosis, "ride his creative Pegasus". Janiger coined the term '"dry schizophrenia," where a person was able to control the surroundings and yet be "crazy" at the same time'.

Many artists and their surviving relatives have kept LSD artwork from this period. One patient of Dr. Janiger, bipolar and alcoholic artist Frank Murdoch, was given a controlled, experimental dose of LSD for several months as an attempt to cure his late stage alcoholism. Janiger had Murdoch paint still-lives both on and off LSD, including a Kachina doll (that he reportedly had 70 other patients also paint). Murdoch also continued to paint as an artist while on LSD, including most of his underwater paintings.

In the Netherlands, Dr. Stanislav Grof practiced psycholytic therapy in the 1980s, which included having his patients paint on LSD. Some of his artist patients painted numerous paintings while on LSD.

Psychedelic artists 

Pablo Amaringo
Brummbaer
Giorgio de Chirico
Robert Crumb
Roger Dean
Warren Dayton
Karl Ferris
The Fool (design collective)
Ernst Fuchs
H. R. Giger
Alex Grey
Rick Griffin
John Hurford
Alton Kelley
Mati Klarwein
Peter Max
Henri Michaux
Stanley "Mouse" Miller
Victor Moscoso
Gilbert Shelton
John Van Hamersveld
Robert Venosa
Robert Williams
Wes Wilson

See also 
 Hallucination
 Lysergic acid diethylamide 
 Psychedelic art
 Psychedelic
 Psychedelic music
 Psychedelic literature
 Tie-dye
 Terence McKenna
 Timothy Leary

References

External links 
 Acid Trip
 Mavericks of the Mind: Oscar Janiger
 LSD Psychotherapy, Stanislav Grof, M.D

Visual arts genres
Psychedelic art